Chung Soo-ki (born 11 June 1971) is a South Korean fencer. He competed in the individual and team foil events at the 1996 Summer Olympics.

References

External links
 

1971 births
Living people
South Korean male foil fencers
Olympic fencers of South Korea
Fencers at the 1996 Summer Olympics
Asian Games medalists in fencing
Fencers at the 1994 Asian Games
Asian Games gold medalists for South Korea
Medalists at the 1994 Asian Games